Julian Reister was the current champions, but chose not to compete this year.

Andreas Haider-Maurer won the title by defeating Antonio Veić 2–6, 6–3, 7–6(7–4) in the final.

Seeds

Draw

Finals

Top half

Bottom half

References
 Main Draw
 Qualifying Draw

ATP Challenger Trophy - Singles
STRABAG Challenger Open